John Forbes-Robertson may refer to:

 Johnston Forbes-Robertson (1853–1937), British stage actor, noted as Hamlet
 John Forbes-Robertson (actor) (1928–2008), British film actor, Dracula in The Legend of the 7 Golden Vampires